José Manuel Fontán Mondragón (born 11 February 2000) is a Spanish footballer who plays as either a left back or a central defender for Dutch club Go Ahead Eagles, on loan from RC Celta de Vigo.

Club career
Born in Vilagarcía de Arousa, Pontevedra, Galicia, Fontán joined RC Celta de Vigo's youth setup in 2011, after representing Arosa SC and UD San Miguel de Deiro. He made his senior debut with the reserves on 14 October 2018, coming on as a late substitute for Diego Alende in a 0–3 Segunda División B away loss against Atlético Madrid B.

Fontán made his professional debut for Celta on 23 January 2020, starting in a 1–2 loss at CD Mirandés, for the season's Copa del Rey. His La Liga debut occurred on 1 October, as he started in a 0–3 home loss against FC Barcelona but was taken off in the 32nd minute due to an injury.

On 27 July 2021, Fontán renewed his contract until 2025, being definitely promoted to the main squad. On 18 June of the following year, he was loaned to Eredivisie side Go Ahead Eagles for the season.

Personal life
Fontán's twin brother Javier is also a footballer. Their father, also named Javier, was also a footballer and a defender; both represented Arosa as a senior.

Career statistics

Club

References

External links

2000 births
Living people
Spanish footballers
Twin sportspeople
Spanish twins
Footballers from Vilagarcía de Arousa
Association football defenders
La Liga players
Segunda División B players
Celta de Vigo B players
RC Celta de Vigo players
Go Ahead Eagles players
Spain under-21 international footballers
Spanish expatriate footballers
Spanish expatriate sportspeople in the Netherlands
Expatriate footballers in the Netherlands